Lamas is the capital of the Lamas Province, situated in the San Martín Region of northern Peru. There are 16,871 inhabitants, according to the 2007 census. The 2005 northern Peru earthquake shook Lamas, killing 5 people and injuring 174; hundreds were left homeless.

History
Lamas has been conquered twice. The first time was for those Pocras and the group of those Hanan Chancas who when being defeated supposedly in the battle of Yahuarpampa for the troops of the Inca Pachacútec in 1438 and conquered their territories natives like Ayacucho, they abandoned their territory and they went into the forest. In their trajectory they found a favorable area to be located, the hill where today the city is located of Lamas, which was inhabited by one of the indigenous groups of the area. Ankoallo, leader of the Pocras, is considered to be the founder of the town of Lamas.

External links

  Homepage

Populated places in the San Martín Region